Paul Oram is a Canadian former politician. He represented the riding of Terra Nova in the Newfoundland and Labrador House of Assembly from 2003 to 2009. He was a member of the Progressive Conservatives.

On October 7, 2009, Oram resigned as Minister of Health and Community Services and as MHA for Terra Nova, citing personal health reasons.

References

Progressive Conservative Party of Newfoundland and Labrador MHAs
Living people
People from Newfoundland (island)
21st-century Canadian politicians
Health ministers of Newfoundland and Labrador
Year of birth missing (living people)